The Puyallup Herald is a weekly newspaper in Puyallup, Washington, United States covering local news, sports, business and community events.

The paper was founded as the Commerce in Tacoma in 1886 and soon moved to Puyallup. renamed Puyallup Independent in 1898. Merged with Sumner Herald in 1903, and resulting paper was named Puyallup Valley Tribune. Editor and publisher Robert Montgomery was courted to run for governor of Washington in 1920, but declined. He continued as editor and publisher until his death in 1936. The Chehalis Bee-Nugget praised it as "one of the outstanding weekly newspapers in the state" in a 1930 editorial.

The paper merged with the Pierce County Herald in 1967, and subsequently had several minor name changes. Renamed from Pierce County Herald (and increased circulation and size) in 1999.

The newspaper is published once a week on Thursday.  The Herald provides news to Puyallup, South Hill, Bonney Lake, Sumner and Edgewood.

This newspaper is owned by McClatchy Company. In 2006 editor Roger Harnack was noted for criticizing the lack of transparency of the local police department and government entities.  Brian McLean became the publisher in 2013. The Tacoma News-Tribune could be considered a competitor, but it is also owned by McClatchey.

A distinct line of newspapers in Puyallup also carried the name Puyallup Herald from 1911 to 1930. That paper started as the Puyallup Republican in 1905 and faded after being renamed the Pierce County Shopper in 1946. ceased publication in 1930

References

External links 
 Mondo Times
 Chronicling America entry (and entry for earlier Herald)
 book written by former columnist Hans Zeiger,narchive

Editors and publishers 
Wini Carter

Newspapers published in Washington (state)
Pierce County, Washington
McClatchy publications